Lubomin may refer to the following places:
Lubomin, Kuyavian-Pomeranian Voivodeship (north-central Poland)
Lubomin, Lower Silesian Voivodeship (south-west Poland)
Lubomin, Gmina Mrozy in Masovian Voivodeship (east-central Poland)
Lubomin, Gmina Stanisławów in Masovian Voivodeship (east-central Poland)
Lubomin, Nowy Dwór Mazowiecki County in Masovian Voivodeship (east-central Poland)